Faraj Salmin al-Buhsani (born 1955) is a Yemeni politician and military officer. He is currently a member of the Yemen's Presidential Leadership Council. He is a former commander of the second military region based in Hadramout. He is the former governor of Hadramout.

Career 

 Member of the Presidential Leadership Council, 7 April 2022
 Governor of Hadramout province, 28 June 2017 – 31 July 2022
 Commander of the second military region, 2016 – 13 August 2022
 Chief of Staff of the second military region, 2015–2016

References 

Yemeni politicians
People from Hadhramaut Governorate
1955 births
Living people
Presidential Leadership Council
21st-century Yemeni politicians